Holyn Lord Koch (born October 12, 1973) is an American former tennis player.

Lord was the Indiana state singles champion in 1989 and 1990 while at Carmel High School, then from 1993 to 1996 played collegiate tennis for the University of Notre Dame. On the professional tour, she made three main draw appearances at the Virginia Slims of Indianapolis. Her elder sister, Courtney Lord, also competed on the WTA Tour.

References

External links
 
 

1973 births
Living people
American female tennis players
Notre Dame Fighting Irish women's tennis players
Tennis people from Indiana